Henri de Paschal de Rochegude (Albi), 8 December 1741 —  Albi, 16 March 1834) was a French Navy officer. He served in the War of American Independence, and became a member of the Académie de Marine.

Biography 
Rochegude joined the Navy as a Garde-Marine on 20 May 1757. He took part in the Second voyage of Kerguelen.

Rochegude was promoted to Lieutenant on 14 February 1778. That year, he served as first officer in the frigate Résolue, part of the squadron under Orvilliers. He took part in the Battle of Ushant on 27 July 1778  He later transferred to the frigate  Junon, taking part in the capture of HMS Ardent in the 17 August 1779.

He later served on the 110-gun Royal Louis, taking part in the Battle of Cape Spartel on 20 October 1782.

Rochegude was promoted to Captain in May 1786. He then started a political career. 

Rochegude retired in 1800, and from then on he research Occitan poetry.

Sources and references 
 Notes

References

 Bibliography
 
 

External links
 

French Navy officers